Bless You, Prison is a 2002 Romanian drama film based on the eponymous novel by Nicole Valéry Grossu.

Cast 
 Maria Ploae - Nicoleta
  - Prison Director
 Ecaterina Nazare - Prisoner 
 Maria Rotaru - Prisoner

References

External links 

2002 drama films
2002 films
Romanian drama films